Jonas Peter Ahnelöv (born 11 December 1987) is a Swedish professional ice hockey defenceman who is currently playing for Leksands IF of the Swedish Hockey League (SHL). He was originally selected by the Phoenix Coyotes, 88th overall, in the 2006 NHL Entry Draft.

Playing career
After his entry-level contract with the Coyotes was concluded he returned to the Swedish Hockey League. He later re-joined for his second stint with Modo Hockey from Frölunda HC on 29 April 2014.

On 20 May 2015 Ahnelöv signed a lucrative one-year contract with Russian club, Avangard Omsk of the KHL. After his first year in the KHL, he signed another two-year contract with Avangard.

At the conclusion of his three-year tenure with Avangard, Ahnelöv opted to return to his native Sweden, securing a one-year deal with Rögle BK for the 2018–19 season, on 6 September 2018. In his lone season with Rögle, Ahnelöv contributed with 3 goals and 7 points in 39 games from the blueline.

On 1 May 2019 Ahnelöv continued in Sweden, signing as a free agent on a two-year contract with newly promoted Leksands IF.

International play
He played for Team Sweden at the 2007 World Junior Ice Hockey Championships in Mora and Leksand, Sweden.
He also represented his country at the 2014 and 2015 World Championship in Minsk and the Czech Republic and the 2018 Olympic Games.

Career statistics

Regular season and playoffs

International

References

External links
 

1987 births
Arizona Coyotes draft picks
Avangard Omsk players
Borås HC players
Frölunda HC players
Ice hockey players at the 2018 Winter Olympics
Living people
Leksands IF players
Modo Hockey players
Olympic ice hockey players of Sweden
People from Huddinge Municipality
Rögle BK players
San Antonio Rampage players
Swedish expatriate ice hockey players in the United States
Swedish ice hockey defencemen
Sportspeople from Stockholm County